The following list shows NCAA Division I football programs by winning percentage during the 1920–1929 football seasons. During this time the NCAA did not have any formal divisions. The following list reflects the records according to the NCAA. This list takes into account results modified later due to NCAA action, such as vacated victories and forfeits.

 Chart notes

 Detroit Mercy joined Division I in 1927.
 Georgetown joined Division I in 1927.
 NYU joined Division I in 1927.
 Furman left Division I after the 1928 season.
 Centre left Division I after the 1925 season.
 Gonzaga played in Division I during the 1922–1925 seasons.
 Fordham joined Division I in 1928.
 William & Mary joined Division I in 1924.
 Carnegie Mellon joined Division I in 1922.
 Marquette joined Division I in 1927.
 Montana State joined Division I in 1923.
 Mississippi College left Division I after the 1924 season.
 Temple did not field a team during the 1920 & 1921 seasons due to World War I.
 Lehigh left Division I after the 1923 season.
 Texas Tech's first season was in 1925.
 Arizona State did not field a team during the 1920 & 1921 seasons.
 Duke restarted football for the 1920 season.
 Idaho joined Division I in 1922.
 Rutgers left Division after the 1923 season.
 Oglethorpe left Division I after the 1925 season.
 Presbyterian left Division after the 1926 season.
 Spring Hill joined Division I for the 1921 & 1922 seasons.
 Fort Benning played Division I during the 1922 season.
 Creighton joined Division I in 1927.
 Birmingham–Southern left Division I after the 1922 season.
 Phillips joined Division for the 1920 & 1921 seasons.
 Miami (FL) played their first season in 1927.
 Richmond joined Division I for the 1921–1925 seasons.
 Montana joined Division I in 1923.
 Chattanooga left Division I after the 1925 season.
 Newberry left Division I after the 1925 season.
 Northern Colorado joined Division I in 1923.
 BYU joined Division I in 1922.
 Millsaps joined Division I during the 1924 season.
 Samford left Division I after the 1924 season.
 Wofford left Division I after the 1926 season.
 Erskine joined Division I for the 1921, 1922 & 1924 seasons.
 Western State joined Division I in 1924.
 Regis (CO) joined Division I during the 1924 & 1929 season.
 Whitman joined Division I for the 1923 & 1924 seasons.
 Southwestern (TX) left Division I after the 1921 season.

See also
 NCAA Division I FBS football win–loss records
 NCAA Division I football win–loss records in the 1910s
 NCAA Division I football win–loss records in the 1930s

References

Lists of college football team records